Lory Lake is a lake in Isanti County, in the U.S. state of Minnesota. It was named after H. A. Lory, an early landowner at the time. The most common species of fish caught in this lake include Northern pike, Largemouth Bass, and Walleye.

See also
List of lakes in Minnesota

References

Lakes of Minnesota
Lakes of Isanti County, Minnesota